The 2022 Victorian state election was held on Saturday, 26 November 2022 to elect the 60th Parliament of Victoria. All 88 seats in the Legislative Assembly (lower house) and all 40 seats in the Legislative Council (upper house) were up for election at the time the writs were issued, however the election in the district of Narracan was deferred due to the death of a candidate.  

Labor was re-elected in a second consecutive landslide, winning 56 seats in the 88-seat Legislative Assembly, a net increase of one seat from the previous election in 2018. This was the sixth time that a Labor government was re-elected in Victoria, and it was Victorian Labor's second-best seat count at a state election. The Liberal/National Coalition made a net gain of one seat for an overall total of 28 seats: the Liberal Party won 19 seats, a net decrease of two from the previous election, while the Nationals won 9 seats, a net increase of three. The Greens won 4 seats, a net increase of one seat. All incumbent independents failed to retain their seats.  

In the Legislative Council, Labor won 15 seats, six short of a majority, and the Coalition won 14 seats. On the crossbench, the Greens won 4 seats, Legalise Cannabis won 2 seats, and one seat each was won by Animal Justice, One Nation, Democratic Labour, the Liberal Democrats and Shooters, Fishers and Farmers. 

Following the election, on 5 December 2022, the Third Andrews ministry was sworn in by the Governor. The new government was little-changed following a significant reshuffle earlier in 2022. The following week the Liberal Party elected John Pesutto leader of the party and Opposition Leader in the new parliament, after Guy had earlier stepped down from the position.

The election in the district of Narracan was deferred to 28 January 2023 due to the death of the National Party candidate Shaun Gilchrist on 21 November, five days before the scheduled election. Labor and the National Party did not contest the supplementary election.

For the election (including the supplementary), Victoria had compulsory voting and used majoritarian preferential voting in single-member seats for the Legislative Assembly, and single transferable voting (STV) along with a group voting ticket (GVT) in multi-member seats for the proportionally represented Legislative Council. The Legislative Council had 40 members serving four-year terms, elected from eight electoral regions each with five members. With each region electing 5 members, the quota in each region for election, after distribution of preferences, was 16.7% (one-sixth) of the valid votes cast in that district. 

The election was conducted by the Victorian Electoral Commission (VEC), an independent body answerable to parliament.

Background

Date 
Pursuant to the Electoral Act 2002, Victoria has fixed terms, with all elections since the 2006 election held every four years on the last Saturday of November. This means that the date for the election was set for 26 November 2022. This could change only if Parliament had been dissolved unexpectedly beforehand.

Previous election and parliament

The Daniel Andrews-led Labor government was returned to power after one term in opposition by winning a majority of seats in the Legislative Assembly at the 2014 state election. The Labor party was decisively re-elected at the 2018 state election with a 5.3% two-party preferred swing, winning 55 seats in the Assembly. This was equal to Victorian Labor's second-best seat count ever at a state election. The Liberal/National Coalition dropped to 27 seats, the Greens won 3 seats and independents won the remaining 3 seats. There were no by-elections for the Assembly in the 59th parliament and the Assembly’s composition was otherwise unchanged. 

In the Legislative Council, the Labor party won 18 of the 40 seats, the Coalition 11 and the remaining seats were won by an array of minor parties. During the term, two Labor MLC's left the party to sit as independents; (Adem Somyurek in June 2020 and Kaushaliya Vaghela in March 2022) while one Liberal MLC (Bernie Finn) was expelled from the party and joined the Democratic Labour Party in June 2022. This left the government with 16 seats in the Legislative Council, and opposition with 10, by the time of the election.

Daniel Andrews and the Labor government was seeking a third four-year term, something only John Cain Jr and Steve Bracks have previously achieved for Labor. Opposition Leader Matthew Guy stood down as Liberal leader several days after the party's poor result at the 2018 election and was replaced by Michael O'Brien. O'Brien’s leadership was challenged twice in 2021, the second time resulting in O'Brien being replaced by Guy in a party room vote and Guy returning to the position.

Electoral system
Victorian state  elections are conducted by the Victorian Electoral Commission (VEC). Though Victoria has compulsory voting, at the 2018 election the voter turnout was just over 90%. Victoria uses instant-runoff voting in single-member seats for the Legislative Assembly, and single transferable vote in multi-member seats for the partially proportionally represented Legislative Council. The Legislative Council presently has 40 members serving four-year terms, elected from eight electoral regions each with five members. With each region electing 5 members, the quota in each region for election, after distribution of preferences, is 16.7% (one-sixth plus 1). Victoria is the only jurisdiction in Australia, at a state or federal level, that retains group voting tickets for the election of its upper house, resulting in preferences of voters voting “above-the-line” being transferred by inter-party agreements. Western Australia, the only other state to employ the system, abolished group voting tickets after the 2021 state election.

Redistribution

The Electoral Boundaries Commission (EBC) of the Victorian Electoral Commission conducted a redistribution of electoral boundaries as there had been two general elections since the last redistribution. The previous redistribution took place prior to the 2014 election, and the new one was conducted in October 2021. According to commentators, Victoria's "booming population" would see new districts created in outer-suburban and inner-city areas, at the expense of middle-suburban areas. At the 2018 election the voter enrollment in individual districts ranged from 61,814 in Cranbourne to 38,937 in Mount Waverley.

On 30 June 2021, the EBC released draft boundaries for the Victorian Legislative Assembly for the 2022 election. The draft boundaries saw the creation of new electorates and the abolition of current ones. The EBC's final report was released on 28 October 2021.

Registered parties

There were 23 parties registered with the Victorian Electoral Commission (VEC) on 31 October 2022:

 Animal Justice Party
 Australian Values Party
 Australian Greens
 Australian Labor Party
 Companions and Pets Party
 Democratic Labour Party
 Derryn Hinch's Justice Party
 Family First Victoria
 Freedom Party of Victoria
 Health Australia Party
 Legalise Cannabis
 Liberal Democratic Party
 Liberal Party
 National Party
 New Democrats
 Pauline Hanson's One Nation
 Reason Party
 Restore Democracy Sack Dan Andrews Party
 Shooters, Fishers and Farmers Party
 Sustainable Australia Party - Stop Overdevelopment/Corruption
 Transport Matters Party
 United Australia Party
 Victorian Socialists

A further 5 applications to register were rejected by the VEC by parties that failed to meet the statutory threshold of 500 registered members: the Australian Democrats, Australian Federation, Fusion, Independence and Indigenous-Aboriginal parties.

In addition, three parties sought to register but later withdrew. Family First Victoria, unrelated to the party of the same name that contested the 2022 South Australian state election, announced it would withdraw its registration on 12 August. On 13 August, the Victorians Party―which had been formally registered by the VEC and had announced a series of candidates―announced it would not contest the election and was later deregistered by the VEC. On 29 September, the Legalise Marijuana Party confirmed it would withdraw after its application was challenged by the Legalise Cannabis party.

Candidates and retiring MPs

The following members announced that they were not contesting the 2022 election:

A record 740 candidates nominated to contest the 88 Legislative Assembly seats at the Victorian election on 26 November, well up on the previous record of 543 candidates in 2014 and the 507 in 2018. The 454 candidates for the Legislative Council is the highest number of upper house candidates in a Victorian election, up from 380 in 2018.

Labor
Luke Donnellan MLA (Narre Warren North) – lost preselection 13 December 2021
Nazih Elasmar MLC (Northern Metropolitan)
John Eren MLA (Lara) – announced 26 November 2021
Martin Foley MLA (Albert Park) – announced 23 June 2022
Mark Gepp MLC (Northern Victoria) – announced 2 December 2021
Danielle Green MLA (Yan Yean) – announced 24 November 2021
Dustin Halse MLA (Ringwood) – announced 24 November 2021
Jill Hennessy MLA (Altona) – announced 24 November 2021
Marlene Kairouz MLA (Kororoit) – lost preselection 13 December 2021
Frank McGuire MLA (Broadmeadows) – lost preselection 13 December 2021
James Merlino MLA (Monbulk) – announced 23 June 2022
Jenny Mikakos MLC (Northern Metropolitan) — announced 26 September 2020
Lisa Neville MLA (Bellarine) – announced 23 June 2022
Martin Pakula MLA (Keysborough) – announced 23 June 2022
Jaala Pulford MLC (Western Victoria) – announced 28 October 2022
Robin Scott MLA (Preston) – lost preselection 13 December 2021
Richard Wynne MLA (Richmond) – announced 25 November 2021

Liberal
Bruce Atkinson MLC (Eastern Metropolitan) – announced 9 June 2022
Gary Blackwood MLA (Narracan) – announced 9 November 2021
Neale Burgess MLA (Hastings) – announced 11 November 2021
Cathrine Burnett-Wake MLC (Eastern Victoria) – lost preselection 31 July 2022
David Morris MLA (Mornington) – lost preselection 10 December 2021
Gordon Rich-Phillips MLC (South Eastern Metropolitan) – announced 17 June 2022
Tim Smith MLA (Kew) – announced 7 November 2021

National
Steph Ryan MLA (Euroa) – announced 5 July 2022

Independent
Russell Northe MLA (Morwell) – announced 26 July 2022

Campaign and controversies
In the lead-up to the state election, Labor Premier Daniel Andrews committed to reviving the State Electricity Commission if re-elected. The government would have a 51% shareholding in the new State Electricity Commission. Andrews committed to amending the state’s constitution to protect public ownership of the revived State Electricity Commission if re-elected, to make it harder, although not impossible, for it to be privatised again in the future. Re-privatising the commission after such legislation would require a "special majority" of 60% of both the Legislative Assembly and Legislative Council, a situation which already exists for any potential privitisation of water services in Victoria under the Constitution of Victoria.

Matthew Guy and the Liberal Party began their election campaign on 2 November with a press conference that saw Guy unveil their "Ditch Dan" vehicle, a 1970s-era ambulance emblazoned with anti-Andrews slogans & graphics. The vehicle having the "Ambulance" designation above the drivers area caused the head of the Victorian Ambulance Union, Danny Hill, to question the legality of the vehicle as the state’s Ambulance Services Act makes it an offence to use the word “ambulance” on any vehicle that is not owned or operated by an ambulance service without written authority of the Department of Health. The ambulance was used to tie into Guy's promise regarding the building of new hospitals and recruiting 40,000 new medical staff.  Guy also promised to axe stamp duty for first home buyers on properties up to $1 million for 12 months.

On 8 November, Guy defended his party advertising attacking Dan Andrews for being a "prick", and the use of footage from antivax protests in Melbourne where protestors urinated on the Shrine of Remembrance and attacked police.

On 10 November, Guy downplayed his deputy David Southwick using two staffers employed by Southwick as actors in campaign ads without disclosing they are members of his campaign staff. When Guy was asked if the use of paid staffers in campaign ads was misleading, Guy replied by endorsing Southwick and stating that "it was not misleading" regardless of the lack of a disclaimer.

On 16 November, Australian Values Party leader Heston Russell leaked a video to the Herald Sun of him to talking to Glenn Druery about a potential preference deal, declaring that the AVP felt the co-ordination of the group voting ticket system used by Druery was immoral and needed to be exposed. This led to calls for the abolition of the group voting ticket, which Matthew Guy has said he would support and asked Andrews to commit to scrapping it, regardless of the election result. Andrews said he would wait until after the previously scheduled electoral reform review, due after the election, before making any changes.

On 17 November, the Victorian Electoral Commission announced that it had referred Guy and his former chief of staff to the Independent Broad-based Anti-corruption Commission after it had exhausted attempts to investigate an alleged violation of political donation disclosure laws. The investigation followed a leak of documents showing a proposed contract requiring a Liberal donor to pay a total of $125,000 to the chief of staff's private marketing firm, potentially in breach of the $4,210 limit on donations from individuals or organisations. In a statement outlining the referral, the Victorian electoral commissioner stressed that the VEC had not "received full co-operation from those connected to its investigation". However, Guy denied allegations of wrongdoing and insisted that he had provided material to the VEC. The following day, the Liberals accused the VEC of deliberate electoral interference and an "intent to damage the Liberal Party in the State Election" in a cease and desist letter by the party's lawyers.

On 19 November, the Liberal Party dumped Renee Heath, the first ranked candidate for the Liberal ticket in the Eastern Victoria Region of the upper house Victorian Legislative Council, from the party after her conservative religious views, including support for conversion therapy, were bought to light by a newspaper investigation. The decision came too late for Heath to be disendorsed by the party, and her position on the ticket makes it an effective certainty that she will win a position in Parliament. Questions were raised over how much Guy and the Liberal Party knew of her views, and the accusations of Entryism made regarding Heath and her family by Liberal party member Cathrine Burnett-Wake in her final address to Parliament after Heath defeated her for pre-selection.

Also on 19 November, Australian Values candidate and state MP Catherine Cumming declared at an anti-lockdown rally that she wished for Premier Daniel Andrews to be turned into a "red mist". These comments were denounced by both Andrews and leader of the Victorian opposition Matthew Guy, and led to the Victoria Police opening an investigation into Cumming for alleged promotion of violence.

On 20 November, The Age reported that the Liberal candidate for Narre Warren North, Timothy Dragan, opposed all recognition of Aboriginal people, said that he would vote against any legislation aimed at tackling climate change, would support a total ban on abortion, and that he called Liberal MP Brad Battin, the member for Berwick, a "prick".

Richmond Labor candidate Lauren O'Dwyer had some controversies relating to her Aboriginal heritage claim disputed by some.

On 21 November, Daniel Andrews claimed that there were neo-Nazi candidates running in the election.

The only state leaders debate between Andrews and Guy was held on 22 November on Sky News Australia and Sky News Regional. Andrews was declared the winner, with 38% of the vote.

Labor accused a 'Greens-dominated' Darebin council of removing Labor billboards in the seat of Northcote.

Polling

Graphical summary

Voting intention

Preferred Premier and satisfaction

Newspaper endorsements 
Prior to the election, several newspapers around the country published editorials endorsing the party they believed should win. News Corp's Melbourne tabloid the Herald Sun, and its Sunday edition the Sunday Herald Sun endorsed the Coalition. News Corp's national masthead The Australian gave an endorsement to the Coalition. The company has been accused by several other media outlets of biased coverage against the Labor Party and Premier Daniel Andrews, with former Australian prime minister Kevin Rudd describing their electoral coverage as "dog-whistling to conspiracy theorists".

Nine Entertainment's national masthead the Australian Financial Review endorsed the Coalition, while Nine's Melbourne-based The Age endorsed Labor. Although the paper conceded that Andrews had become "arrogant", his party offered the better plan for the state.

Weekend editions

Metropolitan dailies

Online publications

Results

Legislative Assembly

* TPP vote total excludes the district of Narracan, which was not contested by Labor. TPP votes are calculated based on the estimate provided by the ABC election computer overseen by Antony Green.

Seats changing hands
Members in italics did not re-contest their Legislative Assembly seats at this election.

The statewide swing against Labor in the primary vote and two-party-preferred vote was mainly concentrated in safe Labor seats in western Melbourne, where Labor members of the Legislative Assembly were re-elected with reduced majorities. Conversely, there was a smaller swing towards Labor in more marginal seats in Melbourne's east. Ultimately, the Labor Party lost the seats of Hawthorn and Nepean to the Liberal Party, as well as the seat of Richmond to the Greens, but won the seats of Glen Waverley and Hastings (the latter notionally almost tied following redistribution) from the Liberal Party.

The Labor-held seats of Bass and Bayswater, which were made notionally Liberal following redistribution, were retained by their Labor incumbents. The Liberal-held seat of Ripon, which was made notionally Labor following redistribution, was won by the Labor candidate. The independent seat of Morwell, which was made notionally Labor following redistribution, was won by the Nationals candidate.

No independent candidates were elected, with all incumbent independents defeated by the Nationals.

It is said by some experts that Labor's State Electricity Commission of Victoria policy had helped Labor win the election.

District of Narracan supplementary election
On 21 November, it was reported that the Nationals candidate for the district of Narracan, Shaun Gilchrist, died suddenly. Under electoral law, this means that the lower house election for Narracan has been declared as "failed" by the Victorian Electoral Commission. A supplementary election was held for that seat on 28 January 2023. The upper house election for that district (within the Eastern Victoria Region) was held as scheduled on 26 November.

Labor and the Nationals did not recontest the supplementary election. Animal Justice Party and Family First Victoria nominated new candidates for the supplementary election. The Liberal party retained Narracan with a slightly increased margin.

Legislative Council

The result in the Legislative Council meant the Labor Party and the left-leaning parties (namely the Greens, Legalise Cannabis, and Animal Justice) had a majority of seats in the chamber; 22 out of 40. After losing four out of five members via the group voting ticket system in the 2018 election, the Greens quadrupled their presence in the chamber. Notable results included the defeat of Reason Party leader Fiona Patten in the Northern Metropolitan region, defeated by former Labor minister and Democratic Labour Party candidate Adem Somyurek for the last position in the region, as well as the election of two Legalise Cannabis MPs to the parliament for the first time in the state's history. One Nation also elected its first state representative.

Legislative Council seats table
Seat totals as noted by the Victorian Electoral Commission.

Party key:

Electoral pendulum

The state underwent a periodic review of its electoral boundaries which was completed in October 2021.

In August 2022, the Victorian Electoral Commission published a report with its own estimates of the results on the new electoral boundary margins. In September 2022, Australian Broadcasting Corporation (ABC) election analyst Antony Green released the seat classifications and new electoral pendulum used by the ABC, which are listed below.

Pre-election pendulum
Members in italics did not contest the election as a candidate for the seat they held or its replacement. However, Will Fowles, Brad Battin and Sarah Connolly contested a different seat to the one they held or its replacement. Lizzie Blandthorn moved to contest the Legislative Council. See the footnotes  for details.

Post-election pendulum

Notes

References

External links
Victorian Electoral Commission Homepage
2022 Victoria Election (ABC Elections)

Elections in Victoria (Australia)
2022 elections in Australia
2020s in Victoria (Australia)
November 2022 events in Australia